Raja Ram (reign 1670–1688) was the first Jat leader, who organised a rebellion against Aurangzeb. He was the chieftain of Sinsini. Before Rajaram the Jats were organised by different village heads dotted around Agra, Mathura and the Jamuna river. To avenge the death of Gokula, Rajaram destroyed Akbar's tomb and dragged Akbar's bones and burned them with the help of Jat Zamindars of Braj. After his death, his brother Churaman and son Rupa continued the struggle against Aurangzeb.

Mughal campaigns against Rajaram
In the first of the two military campaigns of Mughal Nawab Khan-i-Jahan Bahadur Zafar Jang Kokaltash against the Jats of Sinsini, the armies of Amber state ruler and Mathura faujdar joined him. But the combined three forces were defeated by the Jats under the leadership of Rajaram. The parganas of Bhuma, Hodal, Kuthumbar, and Palwal came under the control of Jats after this defeat of Mughals. Based on a contemporary arzdasht (petition), historian R. P. Rana states that this was the period when the Jats living around Agra and Delhi appeared to have revolted. It was the active support of these Jats that made Rajaram victorious. The Jats also ousted imperial revenue officials and the jagirdars''' agents from the parganas in between Delhi and Agra. The Mughals lost control of the region, and after an unsuccessful campaign of one month, Khan-i-Jahan retreated to Mathura.

In his second campaign against the Jats, Nawab Khan-i-Jahan besieged Ram Chahar's fortress in Sogar. Nawab successfully captured the fortress and casualties on the Jat side included Ram Chahar. Nawab next targeted Sinsini, but he had to retreat to Mathura after Rajaram defeated him in a battle near Sinsini. This battle also resulted in the killing of many prominent Rajput leaders from Amber who were fighting on the side of the Mughals. This victory made the Jats even more assertive, and they set up their thanas'' (police posts) after removing those of the Mughals in Ao, Bhusawar, Khohri, Sahar, and Sonkhar.

References

1670 births
1688 deaths
Jat